This is a list of notable British Cypriots.

Greek Cypriots
Christos "Chris" Achilléos, painter and illustrator
Theo Adams, performance artist
Andreas "Andrew" Adonis, Labour peer, politician, academic and journalist
James Alexandrou, actor and television presenter
Anthony Anaxagorou, writer and poet
Peter Andre, singer-songwriter, businessman, presenter and television personality
Lisa Andreas, singer
Dean Atta, poet
Christian and Nick Candy, property developers
Jake and Dinos Chapman, artists
Bambos Charalambous, Labour politician
Anastasios Christodoulou, Foundation Secretary of the Open University
Charlie Christodoulou, soldier and mercenary
Stephen Constantine, football manager
Tula "Tulisa" Contostavlos, singer-songwriter
Antony Costa, singer-songwriter and actor
Peter Costa, professional poker player
Memnos Costi, television presenter and football player
Dappy, real name Costadinos Contostavlos, rapper
Charidimos "Harry" Demetriou, professional poker player
Jamie Demetriou, actor and comedian. Brother of Natasia Demetriou
Jason Demetriou, football player
Mickey Demetriou, football player
Natasia Demetriou, actress and comedian. Sister of Jamie Demetriou.
Chris Dicomidis, rugby union player
Sapphire Elia, actress, model and singer
Barry Evangeli, music producer
Costas Georgiou, soldier and mercenary
George Georgiou, photographer and photojournalist
Michael Georgiou, snooker player
Cat Stevens, also known as Yusuf Islam, real name Steven Georgiou, singer-songwriter and education philanthropist
Jasmine Harman, television presenter
Demis Hassabis, artificial intelligence researcher, neuroscientist, computer game designer, and world-class gamer
D. G. Hessayon, gardener and writer
Sarah Ioannides, conductor
Mick Karn, real name Andonis Michaelides, musician and songwriter
Simon Kassianides, actor, film director, producer and screenwriter
Anthony Kleanthous, football chairman
Jason Koumas, football player
Harry Kyprianou, football player
Andi Kyriacou, rugby union player
Stephen Laughton, playwright
Dimitri Leonidas, actor
Stephanie Leonidas, actress
Georgina Leonidas, actress
Kristian Leontiou, rock singer
Martha and Eve, music and comedy duo
Jack Monroe, poverty campaigner
George Michael, real name Georgios Panayiotou, singer-songwriter and record producer
Alex Michaelides, author and screenwriter
Robert Newman, comedian
Andrew Nicolaides, surgeon and medical expert
Kypros Nicolaides, medical expert
Alexis Nicolas, football player
Nicky Nicolau, football player
Antonis Nikolaidis, Commonwealth shooter
Costa Panayi, computer game programmer
James Panayi, football player
Irena Papadopoulos, nursing researcher
Linda Papadopoulos, psychologist and author
Panayiotis "Peter" Paphides, journalist and broadcast
Theo Paphitis, entrepreneur and broadcaster
Michael Paraskos, novelist and art critic
Andy Paul, born Andreas Pavlou, musician and singer-songwriter
Stelios "Stel" Pavlou, author and screenwriter
Mike Pilavachi, charismatic Christian evangelist and author
Peter Polycarpou, actor
Jack Roles, football player
Giannis Sampson, football player
Sarbel, real name Sarbel Michael, singer
Sir Reo Stakis, hotel magnate
Alex Stavrinou, football player
Chris Toumazou, electronic engineer
Andros Townsend, football player
Chris Tsangarides, record producer, sound engineer, and mixer
Charalambos Xanthos, restaurateur and poker player
Tom Williams, footballer (Cypriot mother)
Nico Yennaris, football player
Haris Zambarloukos, cinematographer

Turkish Cypriots

Nej Adamson, actor
Alev Adil, writer, artist and academic
Peray Ahmet, leader of Haringey London Borough Council
Aydin Mehmet Ali, author and peace campaigner
Erol Alkan, DJ and producer
Mustafa Aslanturk, fashion designer
Patrick Azimkar, British soldier killed during the Massereene Barracks shooting in 2009 
Peri Aziz, singer and former member of Babutsa 
Raşit Bağzıbağlı, fashion designer
Süleyman Başak,  Professor of Finance at the London Business School
Adam Booth, boxing trainer and manager of David Haye
Rhian Brewster, football player 
Nesil Caliskan, Enfield London Borough Council's first female leader
Feri Cansel, actress
Zümrüt Cansel, actress
Kem Cetinay, TV personality and rapper 
Alkan Chaglar, journalist
Hussein Chalayan, MBE, fashion designer
Mete Coban, Labour Councillor for Stoke Newington; founder of My Life My Say
Mutlu Çerkez, artist
Kamil Ahmet Çörekçi, football player
Mehmet Dalman, investment banker and  chairman of Welsh football club Cardiff City
Mustafa Djamgoz, Professor of Cancer Biology at Imperial College London and Chairman of the College of Medicine’s Science Council
Baroness Meral Ece, Liberal Democrats member of the House of Lords
Emma Edhem, councilwoman of the City of London Corporation
Tracey Emin, artist
Aslı Enver, actress
Sümer Erek, artist
Gönül Başaran Erönen, judge in the TRNC Supreme Court
Ten Feizi, Professor and Director of the Glycosciences Laboratory at Imperial College London 
Mem Ferda, actor
Aysha Frade, victim killed during the 2017 Westminster attack
Akin Gazi, actor
Ali Guryel, founder of Bromcom
Ramadan Güney, founder of the first Turkish mosque in the UK (Shacklewell Lane Mosque); and owner of the UK's largest cemetery Brookwood Cemetery
Adam Harison, singer-songwriter; appeared on Little Mix The Search; and pitch invader during the 2020 UEFA European Football Championship final match
Hattie Hasan, CEO of the Stopcocks Women Plumbers
Tamer Hassan, actor
Belle Hassan, Season 5 of Love Island
Hakan Hayrettin, football player
Richard Hickmet, Conservative MP in 1983-87
Aykut Hilmi, actor
Sibel Hodge, writer
Mustafa Hulusi, artist
Atila Huseyin, jazz singer
Hale Hüseyin, football player and captain of the England U-18 Women's National Team
Metin Hüseyin, film director
Mustafa Hussein, football player
Yaşar İsmailoğlu, poet
Kemal Izzet, football player
Muzzy Izzet, football player
Erol Kahraman, ice hockey player 
Işın Karaca, singer
Jem Karacan, football player
Tolga Kashif, music conductor
Leyla Kazim, food and travel photographer 
Colin Kazim-Richards, football player
Eylem Kızıl, singer
Fatma Kiamil, co-founder of JJ Food Service; listed in the Sunday Times Rich List 2020
Mustafa Kiamil, co-founder of JJ Food Service; listed in the Sunday Times Rich List 2020
Selin Kiazim, chef and winner of the Great British Menu
Dervis Konuralp, Paralympic swimmer
Nasir Mazhar, fashion designer
Alp Mehmet MVO, British Ambassador to Iceland in 2004
Billy Mehmet, football player
Dave Mehmet, football player
Deniz Mehmet, football player
Erim Metto, film director
Mem Morrison, actor
Erkan Mustafa, actor
Tarkan Mustafa, football player
Asil Nadir, businessman
Özdil Nami, Minister of Foreign Affairs of Northern Cyprus
Cosh Omar, actor
Arif Ozakca, artist
Hal Ozsan, Hollywood actor
Erhun Oztumer, football player
Ahmet Patterson, boxer
Tony Perry, Wembley Stadium DJ; introduced the song Sweet Caroline as England’s unofficial anthem during the 2020 UEFA European Football Championship
Kenan Poleo, British Consul General and Trade Commissioner for Eastern Europe and Central Asia
Sav Remzi, record producer
Omer Riza, football player
Tolga Safer, actor
Danis Salman, football player
Meliz Serman, stage actress
Kemal Shahin, Big Brother contestant 
Ziynet Sali, singer
Anna Silk, actress 
Ilkay Silk, actress, playwright, producer, and educator
Ali Sönmez, lead singer of Babutsa
Touker Suleyman, fashion retail entrepreneur and a "dragon" on Dragon's Den
Tash, singer
Aden Theobald, Big Brother contestant
Hakan Tuna, rock musician; member of the band Natural Life
Soner Türsoy, member of Babutsa
Fatima Whitbread, javelin thrower
B Young, rapper and singer-songwriter
Zeren Wilson, food and wine specialist and columnist
Sezer Yurtseven, Big Brother contestant
Anatol Yusef, actor
Halil Zorba, weightlifter

See also
 List of Cypriots
 List of Turkish Cypriots
 British Cypriots
 Greek Cypriot diaspora
 Turkish Cypriot diaspora

References

British people of Cypriot descent
British
Lists of British people by origin
Cypriot